The Tajikistan Football Federation (or FFT) is the governing body of football in Tajikistan. The federation was founded in 1936 in the Tajikistan SSR as a sub-federation of the Soviet Football Federation. It was not until 1994 when the Federation was accepted by the international community including the continental and global associations.

Association staff

References

External links
Official website
 Tajikistan at the FIFA website.
 Tajikistan at AFC site

Football in Tajikistan
Football
Sports organizations established in 1936
Tajikistan